Samantha Gori (born 14 July 1968 in Aosta, Italy) is a retired Italian basketball player.

See also
Basketball in Italy

References

1968 births
Living people
Italian women's basketball players
People from Aosta
Sportspeople from Aosta Valley